Prattica Terza is a chamber musical ensemble playing Baroque music on period instruments. It was founded in 2007 by young musicians in Saint Petersburg, Russia.

References

External links
 Official site (Russian)
 Google group

Mixed early music groups
Musical groups established in 2007
Russian performers of early music